Vincennes University (VU) is a public college with its main campus in Vincennes, Indiana. Founded in 1801 as Jefferson Academy, VU is the oldest public institution of higher learning in Indiana.  VU was chartered in 1806 as the Indiana Territory's four-year university and remained the state of Indiana's sole publicly funded four-year university until the establishment of Indiana University in 1820.  In 1889, VU was chartered by the State of Indiana as a two-year university.  From 1999 to 2005, Vincennes University was in a state-mandated partnership with what became the Ivy Tech Community College. In 2005, VU began offering baccalaureate degrees.

VU's campus in Vincennes is a residential campus nestled along the banks of the Wabash River. Other VU sites include a campus in Jasper, Indiana, the Center for Advanced Manufacturing and Logistics in Fort Branch, Indiana, along with centers for Aviation, Logistics, Advanced Manufacturing, and American Sign Language, in the Indianapolis area.

History

Territorial University
Vincennes University is one of the oldest universities north of the Ohio River and west of the Alleghenies. The institution was founded in 1801 as Jefferson Academy and incorporated as Vincennes University on November 29, 1806. Founded by William Henry Harrison, VU along with the University at Buffalo and the University of Virginia, are the only colleges founded by United States Presidents. For over two-hundred years, VU was historically the only two-year university in Indiana, although baccalaureate degrees in seven select areas are now available and were available prior to 1889.

Vincennes University, also known colloquially as Territorial University during the early 19th century, was the only public university established by the Indiana Territory, prior to the formation of the states of Indiana and Illinois. The town of Vincennes was chosen as the location of both the capital of the Indiana Territory and of VU because it was centrally located at the approximate population-density center of the Indiana Territory. Upon the later formation of the Illinois Territory in 1809 in preparation for Indiana statehood, Vincennes fell slightly east of the State of Indiana/Illinois Territory border. As territorial policy progressed through the formation of the Illinois Territory in 1809 (which drastically reduced the size of the Indiana Territory that VU served), the formation of the state of Indiana in 1816 (which considered itself an entirely new and separate legal entity from Indiana Territory that created VU), and the formation of the State of Illinois in 1818, funding for Vincennes University became less and less certain because VU was considered to be owned by the now-defunct Indiana Territory.

Because of Vincennes' status as the capital of the Indiana Territory, it figured prominently in early Indiana-Illinois territorial and statehood policy. For example, on February 3, 1809, the Tenth U.S. Congress passed legislation establishing the separate Indiana Territory in preparation for Indiana's proposed statehood. That Act established the Indiana-Illinois border not with reference to a landmark along Lake Michigan near Chicago, but rather via direct reference to Vincennes: "...all that part of the Indiana Territory which lies west of the Wabash river, and a direct line drawn from the said Wabash river and Post Vincennes, due north to the territorial line between the United States and Canada..."

State of Indiana's State University
Further complicating the question of funding for VU was the State of Indiana's desire to establish its own state-controlled public university in Bloomington, Indiana. Until the establishment of Indiana University, Vincennes University was the sole public university within the entire Indiana Territory and then more narrowly within the state of Indiana. The states of Indiana and of Illinois partially abandoned their financial responsibility for the Territorial University after they had established their own separate public universities that did not present the legal complications of an institution whose legal control perhaps spanned the borders of at least two states and had been established by a defunct governmental entity. Conversely, these complications also set the stage for VU's rich two-century long history with some of the most architecturally-significant early 19th-century buildings to be found at any two-year institution in the U.S.

In the mid-19th century, the Indiana state legislature tried to reclaim the original VU land grant, to be used for what would become Indiana University. The resulting lawsuit (Trustees for Vincennes University v Indiana, 1853) was eventually heard by the U.S. Supreme Court, who decided in VU's favor, based on its earlier decision in a similar case regarding Dartmouth College. The legal dispute arose in part because a portion of VU's status as a land-grant public university derived from the fact that VU is the inheritor of the land-grant and facilities of Territorial University.

To clarify the mission of VU vis a vis Indiana's other institutions of higher education at the time-Purdue University, the State Normal School, and Indiana University, the state of Indiana rechartered VU in 1889, changing it from a four-year university to a two-year university.

Tau Phi Delta and the Sigma Pi fraternity

In 1897, a small literary society called Tau Phi Delta (ΤΦΔ) was started at VU, which soon after became the founding ("Alpha") chapter of Sigma Pi (ΣΠ) Fraternity, making that organization the first of its kind to be founded west of the Ohio Valley. A clock tower on the VU campus commemorates that event. The fraternity has since grown into one of the largest collegiate fraternities and, despite relocating its headquarters to Tennessee; they continue to recognize VU as its birthplace.

Relationship with Ivy Tech Community College
In 1999, Indiana Governor Frank O'Bannon and Stan Jones, commissioner for higher education, persuaded the Indiana state legislature to mandate a "coordinated partnership" between Vincennes University and what was then called Ivy Tech State College (1). Writing for a national publication, reporter William Trombley characterized the "shotgun marriage" as something that was spoken of cautiously by officials at both institutions: "It was not our initiative," Vincennes President Phillip M. Summers said in an interview. "We were asked if we would participate and we agreed". Thomas Cooke, dean of instruction at the Ivy Tech Indianapolis campus, said "We have everything except the liberal arts degree . . . And that could be easily accommodated within our present structure" (4). This tenuous arrangement was dissolved by the 2005 rechartering of Ivy Tech State College as a statewide system of comprehensive community colleges named Ivy Tech Community College.

Academics
Vincennes University offers a diverse set of majors that are focused on careers in teaching and industry. Vincennes University has a 24% graduation rate.

Vincennes University is organized into six colleges:
Business and Public Service (includes Homeland Security and Law Enforcement)
Health Sciences and Human Performance
Humanities
Science, Engineering, and Mathematics
Social Science, Performing Arts, and Communications
Technology

Vincennes is working with Techman and Telamon Robotics to develop a cobot training curriculum.

Buildings

Main campus
(on Eastern Time)
Updike Hall of Science Engineering and Mathematics
Jefferson Student Union (replaced Beckes Student Union in 2017).
Construction Technology Building
Shircliff Humanities Building
Davis Hall (Public Service/Broadcasting)
Homeland Security Building
Governors Hall (Admissions) (Original Beckes Student Union, until 1992).
Welsh Administration Building
Beckes Student Union (built in 1992, it was the student union until 2017).
Wathen Business Building
Donald G. Bell Student Recreation Center
PE Complex
Phillip M. Summers Social Science Building
Robert C. Beless Gym
Robert E. Green Activities Center
Dayson Alumni Center
Della Young Building – Statewide Services
Center for Health Sciences
Tecumseh Dining Center
Red Skelton Performing Arts Center / Red Skelton Museum
Shake Learning Resource Center 
Automotive Technology Building
Residence Halls
Clark Hall
Ebner Hall (College of Technology Learning Community)
Godare Hall

Morris Hall
Vanderburgh Hall
Vigo Hall
Outlying Main Facilities
Indiana (on Eastern Time)
John Deere Agriculture Tech Building (Immediately north of Vincennes on Hwy 41)
Illinois (on Central Time)
O'Neal Airfield; Westport, Illinois
Mid America International Airport; Lawrenceville, Illinois

State historic buildings
Jefferson Academy building
Indiana Territory Capitol Building
Elihu Stout Print Shop

Jasper
(on Eastern Time)
Ruxer Student Center
Habig Technology Center
Administrative Classroom Building
New Classroom Building
Center for Technology Innovation and Manufacturing (CTIM) Building

Indianapolis area
(on Eastern Time)
Aviation Technology Center – houses the Aviation Maintenance program and ground classes for the Aviation Flight Program on the grounds of the Indianapolis International Airport.
Vincennes University Aviation – located on the grounds of Eagle Creek Airpark, this is the base airport for all active Vincennes University aircraft. The fleet consists of many Cessna 172R type aircraft and a Piper PA-44 Seminole.
American Sign Language program at the Indiana School for the Deaf.
Logistics Training and Education Center, Plainfield, Indiana
Gene Haas Training and Education Center, Lebanon, Indiana

Fort Branch / Gibson County
(on Central Time)
Center for Advanced Manufacturing 
February 2016 – In cooperation with North American Crane Certifications (NACC), this facility became an official training and testing site for Crane Institute Certification (CIC).

Athletics

VU is a member of the National Junior College Athletic Association (NJCAA). In honor of its local heritage, the VU team moniker is the Trailblazers. Trailblazers refers to the early years of Vincennes as a French fur-trading post and American outpost in the frontier of the Northwest Territory and its later period as capital of the Indiana Territory. When the Trailblazers moniker needs to be personified by a mascot, VU depicts a Trailblazer as minute man or woodsman-type frontier settler, inspired by such as George Rogers Clark who resided in Indiana after his military career.

The VU Trailblazers compete in baseball, bowling, golf, basketball, cross country, volleyball, and track and field. Its bowling team is particularly well known as it has won 21 NJCAA national championships. The men's bowling team won the 1983 USBC collegiate national championship.  The men's basketball team is a national NJCAA power, winning national titles in 1965, 1970, 1972 and 2019; they were national finalists in 1986.  The men's cross-country team won NJCAA titles in 1969 and 1971; they have 12 additional "Top Ten" finishes in the NJCAA National Finals.

Broadcasting facilities
The university operates television station WVUT, a PBS affiliate, on channel 22. It also operates full-power radio stations WVUB at 91.1 MHz —WFML at 96.7 MHz.

Notable faculty and staff
 Jerry Blemker, baseball coach

Notable alumni
 Isaac K. Beckes - president of Vincennes University from 1950 to 1980
 James C. Denny - Indiana Attorney General from 1872 to 1874
 Max Mapes Ellis, physiologist and explorer.
 William Gainey – first Senior Enlisted Advisor to the Chairman (SEAC) of the Joint Chiefs of Staff
 David Goodnow – CNN news anchor, retired
 Rickey Green - former NBA player; NBA All-Star, NCAA All-American
 Willie Humes—Idaho State; All-American basketball player; Indiana Basketball Hall of Fame inductee (2016)
 Mario Joyner – stand-up comedian and actor
 Carl Landry – former NBA player
 Newton Lee – Computer scientist, author, futurist, and chairman of the California Transhumanist Party.
 Shawn Marion – former NBA player; NBA Champion, NBA All-Star   
 Bob McAdoo – former NBA player, Naismith Memorial Basketball Hall of Fame inductee; 1982 NBA Champion, 1985 NBA Champion, 1975 NBA MVP, five-time NBA All-Star
 John Mellencamp – musician
 Mychal Mulder - NBA player
 Brad Pennington - MLB player
 Jerry Reynolds – former NBA Coach, General Manager; current broadcaster for Sacramento Kings
 Curtis G. Shake – jurist, politician, 72nd Justice of the Indiana Supreme Court, State Senator, and one of the Judges of the United States Nuremberg Military Tribunals
 Maurice Cole Tanquary – entomologist and explorer
 Eric Williams – former NBA player
 Clarence "Foots" Walker – former NBA player; NJCAA National Champion, NAIA National Champion

References

External links

 
Public universities and colleges in Indiana
Southwestern Indiana
Education in Knox County, Indiana
Vincennes, Indiana
Educational institutions established in 1801
Buildings and structures in Knox County, Indiana
Tourist attractions in Knox County, Indiana
Education in Gibson County, Indiana
Buildings and structures in Gibson County, Indiana
1801 establishments in Indiana Territory
NJCAA athletics
Education in Dubois County, Indiana